Cube Quest is a shoot 'em up arcade laserdisc game by American company Simutrek released in 1983. It was primarily designed and programmed by Paul Allen Newell, who previously wrote some Atari 2600 games. It was introduced at Tokyo's Amusement Machine Show (AM Show) in September 1983 and then the AMOA show the following month, before releasing in North America in December 1983.

It combines real-time 3D polygon graphics with laserdisc-streamed, animated backgrounds, making it the first arcade video game to use real-time 3D computer graphics. At around the same time, pre-rendered 3D computer graphics was used in Funai's arcade laserdisc game Interstellar, introduced at the same AM Show in September 1983. Cube Quest was nevertheless the first game to use real-time 3D computer graphics, predating Atari's I, Robot (1984).

Gameplay

The objective of the game is to guide a spaceship through the Cubic World to reach the Treasure of Mytha located at the opposite extreme of the player's origin. Each cube edge leads to one of 54 uniquely themed corridors where a wave of enemies must be dispatched in a tube shooter style gameplay sequence. Destroy the Dewellers of the Dark, up to 1000 points, maneuver to spaceship to avoid the obstacle and destroy the Guardian Cubes, up to 5000 points. Finally, after reaching the Treasure of Mytha, receive a reward befitting the Master of the Cube Quest. After that, the game starts over again.

Development
The game's developer Simutrek was founded by former Atari and Exidy executive Noah Anglin. Paul Allen Newell was responsible for the design and programming. The laserdisc backgrounds were produced by Robert Abel and Associates. Ken Nordine (uncredited) voiced the introductory narration. The game was planned to be released for the Vectrex, but was cancelled when the console went off the market.

Paul Allen Newell was influenced by the computer animations of John Whitney and Jim Blinn, and early 1980s arcade games such as Pac-Man, Tempest, Centipede and Defender. The game's CGI backgrounds were later used in Beyond the Mind's Eye.

Reception and legacy
The game received mixed reviews upon release, with praise for its graphics but criticism over its gameplay. Upon its AM Show debut, the game "was deemed highly complicated for a mainstream electronic diversion" according to Cash Box magazine. Upon its AMOA debut, the game was called "visually stunning" but "hallucinogenic" and "neo-psychedelic" by Cash Box. In Computer Games magazine, Ben Gold and Eugene Jarvis praised the graphics, but Jarvis criticized the gameplay, calling it "a poor version of Tempest."

Possible connection to Polybius legend 
Various researchers, such as Patrick Kellogg, believe that Cube Quest may have been an inspiration for the 2000 urban legend Polybius, due to many similarities between the game and the legend. 

Polybius is frequently described as a Tempest-like shoot-em-up with surreal, often harmful visuals that was frequently visited by men in black before suddenly disappearing forever. Cube Quest, meanwhile, is a Tempest-like game with then-advanced visuals that, due to the unreliable nature of LaserDisc-based video games, was frequently visited for maintenance and often vanished from arcades after a short period of time. 

The name of Polybius'  supposed creator, "Sinneslöchen", even bears a passing resemblance to Cube Quest'''s developer Simutrek.

See alsoAstron Belt''
Polybius (urban legend)

References

External links
Promotional flyer
Gameplay video
Starcade episode featuring the game

1983 video games
Arcade video games
Arcade-only video games
LaserDisc video games
Shoot 'em ups
Trackball video games
Vector arcade video games
Video games developed in the United States
Video games set in outer space